2009–10 Euro Hockey Tour is the 14th edition of Euro Hockey Tour. There are only four teams: Czech Republic, Finland, Russia and Sweden are competing.

Format
The tournament consists of four stages: Czech Hockey Games in Czech Republic, Karjala Tournament in Finland, Channel One Cup in Russia and LG Hockey Games in Sweden. The intervals between stages are usually from 1 month to 3 months. In each phase teams played six games.

Czech Hockey Games

Karjala Tournament

Channel One Cup

LG Hockey Games

External links
EHT

 
2009–10 in European ice hockey
Euro Hockey Tour